Orawan Thampensri (born 25 May 1970) is a Thai former professional tennis player.

Thampensri, who had a best singles ranking of 424, played Federation Cup tennis for Thailand in 1989 and 1990. She won two rubbers, both in doubles, from five ties. 

A four-time Southeast Asian Games medalist, Thampensri represented Thailand at the 1990 Asian Games in Beijing and won a bronze medal in mixed doubles, partnering Vittaya Samrej.

In 1991 she made her only WTA Tour main draw appearances as a local wildcard at the Pattaya Open, losing in the first round to Petra Kamstra. She was also beaten in the first round of the doubles.

ITF finals

Singles: 1 (0–1)

Doubles: 1 (0–1)

References

External links
 
 
 

1970 births
Living people
Orawan Thampensri
Asian Games medalists in tennis
Orawan Thampensri
Medalists at the 1990 Asian Games
Tennis players at the 1990 Asian Games
Competitors at the 1987 Southeast Asian Games
Competitors at the 1989 Southeast Asian Games
Southeast Asian Games medalists in tennis
Orawan Thampensri
Orawan Thampensri
Orawan Thampensri